Norfolk station is an MBTA Commuter Rail Franklin Line station located on Rockwood Road in Norfolk, Massachusetts. The station has one platform which serves a single track, with a mini-high section for accessibility.

The mini-high platform was added along with new parking areas around 1991. A planned project to double-track the line, announced in November 2019, would add a second track and platform at the station.

References

External links
MBTA - Norfolk
Station from Rockwood Road from Google Maps Street View

Stations along New York and New England Railroad lines
MBTA Commuter Rail stations in Norfolk County, Massachusetts